The Island of the Colorblind is a 1997 book by neurologist Oliver Sacks about achromatopsia on the Micronesian atoll of Pingelap. It was published in the UK as The Island of the Colour-blind. The second half of the book is devoted to the mystery of Lytico-Bodig disease in Guam.

The subject was also presented in an episode of the BBC documentary series The Mind Traveller.

External links
 The Island of the Colorblind
 C-SPAN book discussion on The Island of the Colorblind, February 9, 1997
 The Case of the Colorblind Painter

References

1997 non-fiction books
Books by Oliver Sacks
Books with cover art by Chip Kidd